Zee Keralam is an Indian Malayalam language general entertainment pay television channel owned by Zee Entertainment Enterprises. The channel was launched on 26 November 2018 and it is ZEE's fifth channel in the southern region. The channel is headquartered in Kochi, Kerala.

Launch
Zee Keralam with its high definition(HD) variant, Zee Keralam HD was launched on 26 November 2018 and it is ZEE's fifth channel in the southern region.

Programming

Availability
The channel available across India and other countries through satellite and cables. It is also available through digital and mobile entertainment platform, ZEE5. It is also available in Vodafone Idea's Vi Movies and TV service.

References

External links 
 Zee Keralam Official website

Zee Entertainment Enterprises
Malayalam-language television channels
Television channels and stations established in 2018
2018 establishments in Kerala
Television stations in Kochi